Natalya Kostenko (born 9 August 1980, Malotenginskaya, Krasnodar Krai) is a Russian political figure and deputy of the 7th and 8th State Dumas.

Career 
In 2005, Kostenko moved to Moscow, where she started working as a political commentator for the Nezavisimaya Gazeta. From 2008 to 2013, Kostenko served as a Kremlin correspondent for the Vedomosti newspaper. In 2013, she started working at the Institute of Socio-Economic and Political Studies, where, as a deputy director, she interacted with the Federal Coordinating Committee of the All-Russia People's Front. Since 2013, she has been part of the central headquarters of the All-Russia People's Front. On September 18, 2016, she was elected deputy of the 7th State Duma from the Krasnodar Krai constituency. In 2021, she was re-elected for the 8th State Duma.

On 24 March 2022, the United States Treasury sanctioned her in response to the 2022 Russian invasion of Ukraine.

References

1980 births
Living people
United Russia politicians
21st-century Russian politicians
Seventh convocation members of the State Duma (Russian Federation)
Eighth convocation members of the State Duma (Russian Federation)
Russian individuals subject to the U.S. Department of the Treasury sanctions